Engage the Enzyme is the sixth album by rapper, Young MC.  The album was released in 2002 for Stimulus Records.  The album did not make it to the album charts; however it did feature the hit single "Heatseeker."

Track listing
"Intro"- 1:10 
"Stress Test"- 5:36 
"Feel the Love"- 3:45 
"Heatseeker"- 4:03 
"Whop de Whoop"- 4:34 
"Flows"- 5:14 
"Unsigned Diva"- 4:34 
"Babe"- 6:03 
"Crucial"- 6:41 
"One Time for Your Mind"- 4:39 
"Ain't No Way in the World"- 4:22 
"In Case"- 4:22 
"Without Doubt"- 4:26 
"Easier"- 5:37 
"Heatseeker" (Remix)- 4:29 
"Feel the Love" (Remix)- 4:12

Young MC albums
2002 albums